Wahoo is a former settlement in Los Angeles County, California. Wahoo was at an elevation of 912 feet (278 m). Wahoo still appeared on USGS maps as of 1942.

References

Former settlements in Los Angeles County, California
Former populated places in California